Cosmosoma xanthostictum is a moth of the subfamily Arctiinae. It was described by George Hampson in 1898. It is found in Mexico, Guatemala and Panama.

References

xanthostictum
Moths described in 1898